Khoirabari is a small town in Udalguri district in the Indian state of Assam.

Demographics 
As of 2001 India census, Khoirabari had a population of 8,703. Males constitute 52% of the population and females 48%. Khoirabari has an average literacy rate of 74%, higher than the national average of 59.5%: male literacy is 80%, and female literacy is 69%.

Assamese, Bodo and Bengali are the major language. But the most commonly spoken languages include Bodo is spoken widely in the surrounding areas. The locals can even interact in Hindi.

A number of tea gardens are located nearby and Khoirabari is the nearest commercial access point for them.

Education 
Educational Institutions include
 Khoirabari College
 Khoirabari Junior College
 Khoirabari Higher Secondary School
 Uttar Khoirabari Adarsha High School
 U.N. Academy
 Jatiya Vidyalaya
 NRDS Junior College
 Bathou Ashram Phoraisali
 Brilliant Jr. College
 Sankardeva Shishu Niketan

Facilities
Nearest railway station: Khoirabari railway station
Nearest police station: Khoirabari Nearest Airport - LGBI Airport (Guwahati)
Nearest hospital: Khoirabari Gramin Hospital.

Major festivals
Rongali Bihu and Boisagu are in April; Durga Puja in October; Dewali and Holy also celebrated across Khoirabari and surrounding areas.

Khoirabari massacre 

Khoirabari massacre (Bengali: খয়রাবাড়ি গণহত্যাকাণ্ড) refers to the massacre of Bengali Hindu refugee settlers from East Pakistan in Khoirabari in Darrang district (now Udalguri) in the Indian state of Assam. More than hundred Bengali Hindus were killed in the massacre. Before attacking the Bengali Hindus, Bengali Muslims were also attacked by Assamese people. The news of the massacre was reported after several days as the mobs had destroyed all communication system.

References

Cities and towns in Darrang district